The 2013–14 Verbandspokal, (English: 2013–14 Association Cup) consisting of twenty one regional cup competitions, the Verbandspokale, was the qualifying competition for the 2014–15 DFB-Pokal, the German Cup.

All clubs from the 3. Liga and below could enter the regional Verbandspokale, subject to the rules and regulations of each region. Clubs from the Bundesliga and 2. Bundesliga could not enter but were instead directly qualified for the first round of the DFB-Pokal.

All twenty one winners and three additional clubs from the three largest regional football associations, Bavaria, Lower Saxony and Westphalia, were qualified for the first round of the German Cup in the following season. The three additional clubs were the runners-up of the Lower Saxony Cup and the Westphalia Cup while, in Bavaria, the best-placed Regionalliga Bayern non-reserve team qualified as reserve teams are banned from the DFB-Pokal. The Württemberg Cup winner 1. FC Heidenheim was already qualified for the DFB-Pokal through its 3. Liga place and runners-up Stuttgarter Kickers received their spot instead. Of those twenty three clubs qualified through the Verbandspokale seventeen were knocked out in the first round while Chemnitzer FC, MSV Duisburg, Würzburger Kickers, Arminia Bielefeld and 1. FC Magdeburg were knocked out in the second round. Kickers Offenbach, the Hesse Cup winner and 1970 DFB-Pokal champions, was the only one of the twenty three clubs to advance to the third round, where they lost to Borussia Mönchengladbach.

Finals
The 2013–14 Verbandspokal finals with the winners qualified for the 2014–15 DFB-Pokal:.

 ¶The three largest regional associations were allowed to send an additional team. In Westphalia and Lower Saxony this was the losing finalist of the cup. In Bavaria this place went to the best non-reserve team of the Regionalliga Bayern, the FV Illertissen.
 ‡ The Württemberg Cup champion 1. FC Heidenheim was already qualified for the DFB-Pokal through its 3. Liga place, runners-up Stuttgarter Kickers qualified instead.

Clubs by league
The 2013–14 winners and DFB-Pokal qualified runners-up by league:

 Clubs who qualified as runners-up in italics

References

External links
 Official DFB website  The German Football Association
 Fussball.de  Official results website of the DFB

2013–14 in German football cups
Verbandspokal seasons